The National League of Patriotic Youth (L.N.J.P.) was a political movement in Dahomey (later renamed Benin). The organization was founded in 1967. Its followers were nicknamed ligueurs.

The League aligned itself with the military rulers of the country. The organization succeeded in convincing militaries to adopt a Marxist-Leninist political discourse. During the rule of the People's Revolutionary Party of Benin, the erstwhile ligueurs represented the hardline radical factions within the system. The group was highly influential in the years of 1974-1975.

The ligueur faction fell out of line with President Kérékou from 1981 onwards. Within the regime the influence of moderates and technocrats increased whilst the influence of the ligueurs was curtailed.

References

Benin
Defunct political parties in Benin
Socialism in Benin
Youth organizations established in 1967